Gloria Mange (born 1931) is a former Mexican film actress. She was prominent during the Golden Age of Mexican cinema.

Selected filmography
 Primero soy mexicano (1950)
 What Has That Woman Done to You? (1951)
 If I Were a Congressman (1952)
 The Unknown Mariachi (1953)

References

Bibliography 
 Emilio García Riera. Historia documental del cine mexicano: 1949-1950. Universidad de Guadalajara, 1992.

External links 
 

1931 births
Living people
Mexican film actresses
Actresses from Sonora
People from Ciudad Obregón
20th-century Mexican actresses